The 2017 Northwest Territories Men's Curling Championship was held from January 19 to 22 at the Yellowknife Curling Centre in Yellowknife. The winning Jamie Koe team will represent the Northwest Territories at the 2017 Tim Hortons Brier in St. John's, Newfoundland and Labrador.

Teams
The teams are listed as follows:

Round-robin standings

Round-robin results
Draw 1
Skauge 14-1 Lockhart
Koe 7-6 Whitehead

Draw 2
Koe 11-2 Lockhart
Whitehead 7-5 Skauge

Draw 3
Whitehead 15-0 Lockhart
Koe 10-9 Skauge

Draw 4
Koe 9-2 Skauge
Whitehead 8-2 Lockhart

Draw 5
Koe 9-2 Lockhart
Whitehead 7-6 Skauge

Draw 6
Skauge 5-0 Lockhart
Koe 9-4 Whitehead

References

2017 Tim Hortons Brier
Curling in the Northwest Territories
2017 in the Northwest Territories
January 2017 sports events in Canada
Sport in Yellowknife